Christmas with the Everly Brothers and the Boystown Choir is an album by The Everly Brothers, originally released in 1962. This Christmas album includes the 33-member Boys Town Choir and the Boys Town organ in Omaha, Nebraska.

Two songs, "Away in a Manger" and "Angels from the Realms of Glory," are sung entirely by the choir. Don Everly performs "What Child Is This?" solo and Phil "O Little Town of Bethlehem."

The album was re-released on CD by Rhino Flashback in 2005 with a bonus track, "The First Noel".

Track listing 
Side one
 "Adeste Fideles (O Come All Ye Faithful)" (Traditional) – 2:16 
 "Away in a Manger" (Traditional) – 2:05 
 "God Rest Ye Merry, Gentlemen" (Traditional) – 1:30 
 "What Child Is This?" (William Chatterton Dix, Traditional) – 2:21 
 "Silent Night" (Franz Xaver Gruber, Joseph Mohr, Traditional) – 3:01
Side two
"Hark! The Herald Angels Sing" (Felix Mendelssohn, Traditional) – 2:12
 "Angels, From the Realms of Glory" (Traditional) – 3:28 
 "Deck the Halls with Boughs of Holly" (Traditional) – 1:35 
 "Bring a Torch, Jeannette, Isabella" (Traditional) – 1:30 
 "O Little Town of Bethlehem" (Traditional) – 2:17 
 "We Wish You a Merry Christmas" (Traditional) – 1:22

References 

1962 Christmas albums
The Everly Brothers albums
Christmas albums by American artists
Warner Records albums
Covers albums
Rhino Records albums
Country Christmas albums
Pop rock Christmas albums